bdnews24.com is an English and Bengali language news website of Bangladesh.

History

In 2005, the company launched initially as the country's first exclusively web-based news agency, and was known as BDNEWS. The website bdnews24.com developed by Ahmed Yasir Riad (2005-2013) was Bangladesh's first 24/7 bilingual news web portal. The other two national news agencies at the time were the state-owned Bangladesh Sangbad Sangstha (BSS) and the privately owned United News of Bangladesh (UNB), which at the time were teleprinter-based "wire services". Following a take-over in mid-2006 at the agency's holding company Bangladesh News 24 Hours Ltd, ownership is vested between two sole board directors: Managing Director and Editor-in-Chief Toufique Imrose Khalidi, and Chair of the company Asif Mahmood.

In October 2006, bdnews24.com relaunched as Bangladesh's first free online newspaper developed by Yasir, and was rebranded as bdnews24.com. Editor-in-Chief Khalidi is a journalist and former BBC broadcaster. On 28 May 2012 the office of bdnews24.com was attacked by men with machetes injuring three journalists.

Website block
In June 2018, Bdnews24.com was blocked without explanation by the Bangladesh Telecommunication Regulatory Commission (BTRC). After several hours, the BTRC unblocked the website. According to the chairman of the BTRC, the site had "added some objectionable comments in one of their news items". The item was not identified by the BTRC, but other sources reported that it was about General Aziz Ahmed's appointment as army chief of staff.

References

External links 
  (EN)
  (BN)

2005 establishments in Bangladesh
Bangladeshi news websites